The Torneo del Nordeste, commonly known as the Regional del Nordeste Argentino, is a regional rugby union competition in Argentina. 

The competition started in 1999 and involves clubs from the unions of Union de Rugby del Nordeste (Chaco and Corrientes), Union de Rugby de Formosa and Union de Rugby de Misiones. 

As in other inter-provincial tournaments, such as the Torneo del Litoral or Torneo del Noroeste, the best clubs from the Torneo del Nordeste qualify for the national level Torneo del Interior.

Championships
The Torneo del Nordeste includes 8 teams competing for the regional title. All the champions are listed below:

Titles

Notes

Titles by club

References

External links
 
 Unión de Rugby de Misiones

Rugby union leagues in Argentina